The 6th Division was an infantry division of the British Army and was first formed in 1810. The division was commanded by a general officer commanding (GOC). In this role, the GOC received orders from a level above him in the chain of command, and then used the forces within the division to undertake the mission assigned. In addition to directing the tactical battle in which the division was involved, the GOC oversaw a staff and the administrative, logistical, medical, training, and discipline of the division.

Prior to 1809, the British Army did not use divisional formations. As the British military grew in size during the Napoleonic Wars, the need arose for such an implementation in order to better organise forces for administrative, logistical, and tactical reasons. The 6th Division was formed in 1810 by Lieutenant-General Arthur Wellesley, and served in the Peninsular War (part of the Napoleonic Wars).

General officer commanding

Notes

References

 
 
 
 
 
 
 
 
 
 
 
 
 
 
 

British Army personnel by war
British Army personnel of the Napoleonic Wars
British Army personnel of the Peninsular War
British Army personnel of the Second Boer War
British Army personnel of World War I
British Army personnel of World War II
British Army general officer commanding lists